One in a Million were a 1960s psychedelic rock band from Glasgow, Scotland, that included Jimmy McCulloch, later a member of Paul McCartney's Wings, as their lead guitarist. They released two singles, "Use Your Imagination" / "Hold On" for CBS, and "Double Sight" / "Fredereek Hernando" for MGM. This has become one of the most collectable psychedelic singles, and was included in David Wells' Top 100 Psychedelic Records by Record Collector magazine. A compilation album was released in 2008, which included both their singles and previously unreleased acetate tracks. Their song "No Smokes" was used in an episode of the TV series Clangers.

Discography

Singles 
 "Use Your Imagination" / "Hold On" (CBS 202513) 1967
 "Fredereek Hernando" / "Double Sight" (MGM 1370) 1967

Compilation albums
Double Sight (Wooden Hill WHCD018) 2008

References

British psychedelic rock music groups
Scottish rock music groups